The 1999 Major League Baseball postseason was the playoff tournament of Major League Baseball for the 1999 season. The winners of the League Division Series would move on to the League Championship Series to determine the pennant winners that face each other in the World Series. 

In the American League, the New York Yankees and Cleveland Indians returned to the postseason for the fifth straight time, and the Boston Red Sox and Texas Rangers returned for the second year in a row. 

In the National League, the Atlanta Braves made their eighth straight postseason appearance, the Houston Astros made their third straight appearance, the New York Mets made their first appearance since 1988, and the Arizona Diamondbacks made their postseason debut two years into their existence.

The postseason began on October 5, 1999, and ended on October 27, 1999, with the Yankees sweeping the Braves in the 1999 World Series. It was the Yankees' 25th title, which made the Yankees the team with the most championship wins in North American sports, surpassing the Montreal Canadiens who won 24.

Playoff seeds
The following teams qualified for the postseason:

American League
 New York Yankees - 98–64, Clinched AL East
 Cleveland Indians - 97–65, Clinched AL Central
 Texas Rangers - 95–67, Clinched AL West
 Boston Red Sox - 94–68, Clinched Wild Card

National League
 Atlanta Braves - 103–59, Clinched NL East
 Arizona Diamondbacks - 100–62, Clinched NL West
 Houston Astros - 97–65, Clinched NL Central
 New York Mets - 97–66, Clinched Wild Card

Playoff bracket

Note: Two teams in the same division could not meet in the division series.

American League Division Series

(1) New York Yankees vs. (3) Texas Rangers 

This was the third postseason meeting between the Yankees and Rangers. The Yankees once again swept the Rangers to return to the ALCS for the fourth time in six years. This series was not close - the Yankees held the Rangers to only one run scored throughout the entire series.

The Yankees and Rangers would meet one more time, in the 2010 ALCS, and in that series, the Rangers would finally break through before falling in the World Series that year.

(2) Cleveland Indians vs. (4) Boston Red Sox 

This was the third postseason meeting between the Indians and Red Sox. The Red Sox overcame a two games to none series deficit to defeat the Indians to return to the ALCS for the first time since 1990.

The Indians controlled the tempo of the first two games - they narrowly took Game 1 by one run, and then blew out the Red Sox in Game 2 to go up 2-0 in the series. When the series shifted to Boston, the series then got ugly for the Tribe - the Red Sox blew out the Indians in Game 3, and in Game 4, the Red Sox decimated the Indians by a 23-7 score, setting an MLB record for most runs scored in a postseason game and handing the Indians their worst postseason loss ever. Game 5 was an offensive duel which the Red Sox won 12-8 to close out the series and advance.

The Indians would make their next postseason appearance in 2001.

National League Division Series

(1) Atlanta Braves vs. (3) Houston Astros 

This was the second postseason meeting between the Braves and Astros. The Braves once again defeated the Astros to return to the NLCS for a record eighth straight time. Though the Astros stole Game 1 on the road, the Braves took the next three games to advance to the next round.

Game 4 was the last game ever played at the Astrodome.

(2) Arizona Diamondbacks vs. (4) New York Mets 

This was the first postseason in franchise history for the D-Backs, as they made it in their second year in their history, becoming the fastest expansion team to accomplish such a feat. The Mets defeated the D-Backs in four games to return to the NLCS for the first time since 1988.

In Phoenix, the Mets stole Game 1 on the road by four runs, while the D-Backs won their first postseason game in franchise history in a blowout win in Game 2. When the series moved to Queens, the Mets blew out the D-Backs in Game 3, and then took Game 4 in extra innings to close out the series.

The next postseason appearance for the D-Backs would be in 2001, where they went on to win the World Series against the New York Yankees in seven games.

American League Championship Series

(1) New York Yankees vs. (4) Boston Red Sox 

This was the first postseason meeting in the history of the Yankees-Red Sox rivalry. The Yankees defeated the Red Sox in five games to return to the World Series for the fourth time in five years.

The Yankees narrowly took the first two games in the Bronx to go up 2-0 in the series headed to Boston. Game 3 was the anticipated matchup between Pedro Martínez and Roger Clemens, which the Red Sox won in a blowout, 13-1, to avoid a sweep. Game 3 was known for chants thrown at Clemens by the Fenway Park crowd as he was retired in the third inning, as they shouted "Where is Roger?" and then followed up with "In the Shower". However, the Yankees responded with a blowout win in Game 4 to go up 3-1 in the series, and then took Game 5 by a 6-1 score to secure the pennant.

Both teams would meet again in the 2003 ALCS (Yankees victory), 2004 ALCS (Red Sox victory), 2018 ALDS (Red Sox victory), and the 2021 AL Wild Card Game (Red Sox victory).

The Yankees returned to the ALCS again the next year, where they defeated the Seattle Mariners in six games en route to completing a three-peat. The Red Sox would not return to the postseason again until 2003.

National League Championship Series

(1) Atlanta Braves vs. (4) New York Mets 

This was a rematch of the very first NLCS from 1969, which the Miracle Mets squad won in a sweep over the Braves en route to their first World Series title. On the 30th anniversary of the first-ever NLCS, the Braves returned the favor, winning the series in 6 games and returning to the World Series for the fifth time this decade. 

Greg Maddux lead the Braves to victory in Game 1, and the Braves took Game 2 by one run to go up 2-0 in the series headed to Queens. The Braves shut out the Mets in Game 3 thanks to a solid pitching performance from Tom Glavine to go up 3-0 in the series. In Game 4, the Mets held off a late rally by the Braves to avoid a sweep. In a long and ugly Game 5, the Mets rallied in the bottom of the fifteenth inning to win and send the series back to Atlanta. Game 6 was an offensive duel that went down to the wire in extra innings. In the top of the tenth, the Mets took a one-run lead, however the Braves countered by tying the game in the bottom of the inning to stay alive. In the bottom of the eleventh, the Braves loaded the bases thanks to two intentional walks from New York's Kenny Rogers, who then walked Andruw Jones on a 3-2 count, giving the Braves the win on a walk-off walk.

The Mets would return to the NLCS the very next year, and defeat the St. Louis Cardinals to return to the World Series. This would be the last NL pennant won by the Braves until 2021.

1999 World Series

(AL1) New York Yankees vs. (NL1) Atlanta Braves 

This was the fourth World Series meeting between these two teams. The Braves had won in 1957, while the Yankees won in 1958 and 1996. The Yankees would sweep the MLB-best Braves to repeat as World Series champions, winning their third title in the past four years.

In Atlanta, the Yankees shocked the Braves, as they held them to only three runs scored in the first two games to go up 2-0 in the series headed to the Bronx. The only close battle of the series occurred in Game 3, as the game remained tied at 5 going into extra innings until New York's Chad Curtis hit a walk-off solo home run to put the Yankees ahead 3-0 in the series. The Yankees closed out the series with a solid pitching performance from Roger Clemens in Game 4. This was the last championship the Yankees won at the original Yankee Stadium.

With the win, the Yankees became the first team to win the World Series in back-to-back sweeps since they did so in 1938 and 1939, and still remain the only franchise in the MLB to accomplish such a feat. 

This was the first World Series to feature both #1 seeds from the American and National leagues, a phenomenon that has only been repeated twice since, in 2013 and 2020.

The Yankees returned to the World Series the next year, and defeated their cross-town rival New York Mets in five games to finish off a three-peat. The Braves wouldn't return to the World Series again until 2021, where they defeated the Houston Astros in six games.

References

External links
 League Baseball Standings & Expanded Standings - 1999

 
Major League Baseball postseason